The  Kassel Synagogue is the description given to a succession of prayer houses of the Jewish community in Kassel, Hesse.

Construction in 1839 
In 1827, a previous synagogue was closed due to its dilapidated state. In 1828, the government offered a new location for the construction of a new synagogue at the corner of Untere Königsstraße and Bremerstraße. Several blueprints (by August Schuchardt, Conrad Bromeis, and Julius Eugen Ruhl) were rejected by the community. Finally, a blueprint by Albrecht Rosengarten was accepted, and the new synagogue was opened on August 8, 1839. It was the first Rundbogenstil synagogue.

Nazi rule and destruction of the synagogue 
On November 7, 1938, in the course of Kristallnacht, the synagogue was desecrated by the Nazis; part of its interior decoration and ritual accessories were burned outside. On November 11, 1938, the city authorities decided to demolish the synagogue. Today, there is a memorial plaque at its former location with the following inscription:

Post-war period

A new prayer hall was built in Heubnerstraße in 1952/53. As it became too small by the 1960s, the decision was made to build a new synagogue with a community centre. On December 12, 1965, the new building with the community hall for 100 people was inaugurated. As it in turn became too small for the growing Jewish community, another new synagogue, designed by architect Alfred Jacoby, was built in 2000 with funds provided, among others, by the government of Hesse, the city of Kassel, the North-Hesse administrative districts, the local branch of the Evangelical Church in Germany, the Diocese of Fulda, and through private donations.

References

Synagogues destroyed during Kristallnacht (Germany)
Rundbogenstil synagogues
Religious buildings and structures in Hesse
Buildings and structures in Kassel
Synagogues completed in 1839